Decibel  is a 2022 South Korean urban terror action film directed by Hwang In-ho, starring Kim Rae-won, Lee Jong-suk, Jung Sang-hoon, Park Byung-eun and Cha Eun-woo. It was released on November 16, 2022.

Premise 
Decibel is a sound terror action film revolving around a bomb designer who wants to occupy the city center with a special bomb that explodes when the noise increases and a former naval deputy commander who becomes his target.

Cast 
 Kim Rae-won as Kang Do-young, ex-Navy Submarine Commander who became the target of terrorism
 Lee Jong-suk as Jeon Tae-seong,  bomb designer and Navy Lieutenant from Mensa
 Jung Sang-hoon as Oh Dae-oh, special reporter who came to accompany a terrorist incident
 Park Byung-eun as Cha Young-han, Defense Security Support Command (military intelligence) agent
 Cha Eun-woo as Jeon Tae-ryong, Navy Submarine Sound Detection Officer
 Lee Sang-hee as Jang Yoo-jung, Navy EOD Petty Officer  
 Jo Dal-hwan as Noh Jung-seop, Navy submarine sound detective
 Lee Min-ki as Lieutenant Hwang Yong-woo, Navy Submarine Lieutenant
 Jo In-woo as Lee Dae-woo, who is a member of the military security support unit.

Production 
Principal photography began on April 20, 2021.

On November 14, 2022, the film was invited to screen at the Asian World Film Festival, which premiered on November 12.

References

External links
 
 
 
 
 
 Decibel Official North American Website (in English)

2022 films
2020s South Korean films
2020s Korean-language films
2022 action films
South Korean action films
Films about terrorism in Asia
Films about the Republic of Korea Navy
Films set in Busan
Submarine films